Sujan Mukherjee (born 10 February 1955) is an Indian former cricketer. He played twelve first-class matches for Bengal between 1980 and 1986.

See also
 List of Bengal cricketers

References

External links
 

1955 births
Living people
Indian cricketers
Bengal cricketers
Cricketers from Kolkata